Obed Barney was an American politician who served in the Massachusetts House of Representatives, and in the Massachusetts Senate.

Political offices
Barney was a member of the Massachusetts House of Representatives in 1843, and a member of the Massachusetts Senate from the Nantucket and Dukes County District in 1844.

Other activities

Barney married Lavinia Coffin in Nantucket on January 15, 1832.

In 1848 Barney's nephew Benjamin B. Myrick bought out a substantial lard oil business, with Barney becoming a partner in the business. The factory was destroyed by fire in 1855, but rebuilt with better equipment, and the partners sold the business in May 1857.

References

People from Nantucket, Massachusetts
Members of the Massachusetts House of Representatives
Massachusetts state senators